Hoiberg is a surname. Notable people with the surname include:

Dale Hoiberg, American sinologist and editor
Fred Hoiberg (born 1972), American basketball player and coach
Nina Høiberg (born 1956), Danish chess player

See also
Markus Høiberg (born 1991), Norwegian curler